The Secret Six is the name of four distinct, fictional comic book teams in the . Each team has had six members, led by a mysterious figure named Mockingbird, whom the characters assume to be one of the six themselves.

First team (1968–1969)
 August Durant
 Lili de Neuve
 Carlo di Rienzi
 Tiger Force (Mike Tempest)
 Crimson Dawn (Kit Dawn or Kim Dawn)
 King Savage

Second team (1988–1989)
 August Durant
 Mitch Hoberman
 Ladonna Jameal
 Tony Mantegna
 Luke McKendrick
 Vic Sommers
 Dr. Maria Verdugo

Third team (2005–2011)
 Cheshire
 Deadshot
 The Fiddler
 Parademon
 Rag Doll
 Scandal Savage
 Catman
 Knockout
 Mad Hatter
 Harley Quinn
 Bane
 Jeannette
 Black Alice
 King Shark
 Dwarfstar
 Lady Vic
 Giganta

Fourth team, New 52 (2015-2016)
 Catman
 Black Alice
 Strix
 Ventriloquist (Shauna Belzer)
 Porcelain 
 Big Shot

Fifth team, The Infected 
 The Commissioner (Jim Gordon)
 King Shazam (Billy Batson/Shazam)
 Scarab (Jaime Reyes/Blue Beetle)
 Deathbringer (Donna Troy)
 Supergirl (Kara Zor-El)
 Sky Tyrant (Carter Hall/Hawkman)
 The Batman Who Laughs

References

Secret Six